Luys i Luso ("Light from the Light") is the seventh album by Armenian pianist Tigran Hamasyan. It was released to commemorate the 100th anniversary of the Armenian genocide.

Production
The album is arranged for piano and voices, and features the Yerevan State Chamber Choir with conductor Harutyun Topikyan. Tigran Hamasyan is a pianist and played the piano in the recording for the album. Unlike Hamasyan's previous albums, the music is more heavily inspired by the Armenian folk style and draws from Armenian sacred music. The tracks on the album are varied and include developments of fifth-century sharakans to modern-day hymns. The album was recorded in October 2014 and produced by the founder of ECM Records, Manfred Eicher.

Hamasyan later said in an interview that God had intervened in the recording of the album:

Release
Luys i Luso was released on 4 September and 2 October 2015 in the United States.

Performance
As part of the commemoration of the Armenian Genocide, the work was performed in 100 churches around the world. Hamasyan had also performed the work at churches located in Armenia and surrounding countries before the release of the work, however, he refused performing in Turkey. He said that this was because he could not "... go somewhere where people killed my great-grandfather and his sisters ... [and] play in front of a crowd that still denies that they killed my family". However, when asked to perform this work in towns that used to be in Armenia but are now in Turkey, he went there to perform. Although Hamasyan was encouraged by his Turkish fans to perform in Turkey, there was opposition from others. This included the mayor of Kars, Murtaza Karaçanta, who had made racist remarks about Hamasyan and the other performers, and right-wing Turkish groups, such as Grey Wolves, who had made threats against the performers. Because of these threats the performers were given a police escort whilst in Turkey.

Art project
An art project, also called Luys i Luso, was commissioned by Hamasyan which explores and documents the creation and performance of the album. The finished art installation used large digital screens and the music from the album in a 35-minute exhibition which explores the album's creation, performance, and the tour of the 100 churches around the world. The installation was displayed in Depo (an art gallery in Istanbul) over six days. It was later hosted by The Armenian General Benevolent Union, BRIC Arts Media, and SKLAD in Plovdiv. The installation was also shown in Little Armenia, Los Angeles, accompanied by a live performance by Hamasyan.

Track listing 
All tracks written or arranged from a tune by Tigran Hamasyan. English translations from Between Sound and Space, unless otherwise noted:

References 

2015 albums
ECM Records albums
Tigran Hamasyan albums